Orya barbarica is a species of centipedes belonging to the family Oryidae.

References

 J. G. E. Lewis  The Biology of Centipedes

Geophilomorpha
Animals described in 1835
Arthropods of Africa